Aristodemo Costoli (1803–1871) was an Italian sculptor who spent his entire career in the city of Florence.  His students included Emilio Zocchi, Girolamo Masini, Augusto Rivalta and his son Leopoldo Costoli.

Partial anthology of works

Florence
 Galileo in Tribune of Galileo, at Museo della Specola (1832);
 Christophe Colomb, at musée du Nouveau Monde, La Rochelle (France);
 Pegasus, in Giardino di Boboli;
 tondo dedicated to Arnolfo di Cambio in Duomo di Firenze;
 bust of Cosimo Buonarroti and Rosina Vendramin, in Casa Buonarroti;
 Monument to L. Matteucci (1845), in Badia Fiorentina;
 Discovery of America, in Hall 5 of Galleria d'arte moderna (Firenze) in Palazzo Pitti;
 Monument to Galileo, niche in the ground-floor courtyard of the Uffizi Gallery (1851);
 Jeremiah (Palazzo Pitti);
 Funeral Monument to Della Gherardesca (Santa Maria del Fiore a Lapo);
 Bas-relief of Villa Paolina (Sesto Fiorentino).

Other cities in Italy
 Genoa: Prudence and Columbus placing flag on Beach (1862), monument to Christopher Columbus.
 Ancona: Monument to Cavour (1868), with statue dedicated to Cavour and two bas-reliefs, at Cavour square.
 Pisa: Monument to Angelica Catalani (1859), at Camposanto.
 Lucca: Bust of Leopold II,  Museo nazionale di villa Guinigi.

Other countries:
 Santiago, Chile: Monument to Pedro de Valdivia Saint Petersburg: Memorial to Ekaterina Arkadievna Kotchoubey and her daughter Vera France, La Rochelle, Musée du Nouveau Monde, La découverte de l'Amérique, marbre blanc, 78x40x26 cm
 Private commissions, England.

References

Mackay, James, The Dictionary of Sculptors in Bronze'', Antique Collectors Club,  Woodbridge, Suffolk 1977

1803 births
1871 deaths
Sculptors from Florence
19th-century Italian sculptors
Italian male sculptors
19th-century Italian male artists